Allen Williams may refer to:
 J. Allen Williams (born 1960), American animator, writer and director
 Allen Lane (Allen Lane Williams, 1902–1970), British publisher

See also
 Allan Williams (1930–2016), British businessman and promoter
 Allan Williams (politician) (1922–2011), British Columbia politician